is a passenger railway station located in the city of Inagi, Tokyo, Japan, operated by the private railway company, Keio Corporation.

Lines 

Station Layout
This station consists of two opposed elevated side platforms serving two tracks, with the station building located underneath.

Platforms

History
The station opened on April 1, 1971.

Passenger statistics
In fiscal 2019, the station was used by an average of 13,687 passengers daily. 

The passenger figures for previous years are as shown below.

Surrounding area
 Yomiuriland
It takes about 5 minutes from here to the entrance of the land by Gondola which is named as Skyshuttle at 300 yen on one trip.

See also
 List of railway stations in Japan

References

External links

Keio Railway Station Information 

Railway stations in Japan opened in 1971
Keio Sagamihara Line
Stations of Keio Corporation
Railway stations in Tokyo
Inagi, Tokyo